Glaucocharis bilinealis is a moth in the family Crambidae. It was described by Hans Georg Amsel in 1961. It is found in Afghanistan.

References

Diptychophorini
Moths described in 1961